Phontakorn Thosanthiah (born March 4, 1991) or formerly named Watsaphon Thosanthiah (simply known as Golf, is a Thai professional footballer who last played as a defender for Thai League T1 club Sukhothai.

Club career

External links
 Profile at Goal

1991 births
Living people
Phontakorn Thosanthiah
Phontakorn Thosanthiah
Association football defenders
Phontakorn Thosanthiah
Phontakorn Thosanthiah
Phontakorn Thosanthiah
Phontakorn Thosanthiah
Phontakorn Thosanthiah
Phontakorn Thosanthiah